Ust-Muravlyanka is a rural locality (a selo) and the administrative center of Skoritskoye Rural Settlement, Repyovsky District, Voronezh Oblast, Russia. The population was 858 as of 2010. There are 8 streets.

Geography 
Ust-Muravlyanka is located 18 km southeast of Repyovka (the district's administrative centre) by road. Kolbino is the nearest rural locality.

References 

Rural localities in Repyovsky District